Kenneth Paine Edwards (March 9, 1886 – December 21, 1952) was an American golfer who competed in the 1904 Summer Olympics.

In 1904 he was part of the American team which won the gold medal. He finished fifth in this competition.

External links
 Kenneth Edwards' profile at databaseOlympics
 Kenneth Edwards' profile at Sports Reference.com

American male golfers
Amateur golfers
Golfers at the 1904 Summer Olympics
Olympic gold medalists for the United States in golf
Medalists at the 1904 Summer Olympics
1886 births
1952 deaths